Choirboys is the self-titled debut album of the Australian rock band Choirboys. The album was recorded in early 1983 at Albert Studios One in Sydney, Australia with producer, Jim Manzie. and released in July of the same year. The first single, "Never Gonna Die," was released with great success and reached #21 on the Australian singles charts in late 1983. Australian TV personality and music guru Ian "Molly" Meldrum hailed the album as, "destined to become an Aussie classic." On the strength of their debut album, Choirboys, were invited to open for Cold Chisel on their "Last Stand" tour.

Track listing 
 "Running from the Storm" - 2:15
 "Talk Big" - 3:04
 "Never Gonna Die" - 4:03
 "You're With The Big Boys Now (Carrie)" - 3:13
 "Boys in the Band" - 4:59
 "Fight by the Book" - 3:33
 "Bought and Paid For" - 3:43
 "I'm Not Your Hero" - 4:05
 "Blood is Thicker than Water" - 3:20
 "Bullshit" - 3:58

External links
Official Choirboys site

1983 debut albums
The Choirboys (band) albums